Aditoprim is an antibacterial dihydrofolate reductase inhibitor.

References

Bacterial dihydrofolate reductase inhibitors
Aminopyrimidines
Anilines
Dimethylamino compounds